Charles Richard Atkinson-Grimshaw (17 December 1877 – 14 October 1933) was an English footballer who played for Belgian club Racing Club de Bruxelles  as a forward. He was topscorer in the Belgian First Division in the 1899–1900 season.

He was the son of Charles William Atkinson-Grimshaw, a retired soldier who died in Bruges in 1892, and Charlotte Honoria Louise Digby Wright. Atkinson-Grimshaw died in Florence, Italy, where he worked at the British Consulate.

References

1877 births
1933 deaths
Footballers from Plymouth, Devon
English footballers
Association football forwards
K.F.C. Rhodienne-De Hoek players
Belgian Pro League players
English expatriate footballers
English expatriate sportspeople in Belgium
Expatriate footballers in Belgium
English expatriates in Italy